Aruba women's national softball team is the national team for Aruba.  The team competed at the 1990 ISF Women's World Championship in Normal, Illinois where they finished with 2 wins and 7 losses.

References

External links 
 International Softball Federation

Softball
Women's national softball teams
Softball in Aruba
Women's sport in Aruba